"Hope That We Can Be Together Soon is a song written by Kenneth Gamble and Leon Huff, that was originally recorded by Dusty Springfield as "Let's Get Together Soon" and was included in her 1970 album, A Brand New Me.  The track was produced by Gamble and Huff.

1975 cover version
The composition scored a hit when it was released by Sharon Paige and Harold Melvin & the Blue Notes in 1975. Unlike most of the group's singles from this time period, Melvin handles most of the vocal duties, while Teddy Pendergrass appears for one line and the closing part of the song. Paige took on a more prominent role in the group after Pendergrass left the group for a solo career.

Chart performance
Released in 1975 from the album To Be True, it reached number one on the Hot Soul Singles chart in the summer of that year. It reached number 42 on the Billboard Hot 100.

Chart positions

References

External links
[ Song review] on AllMusic

1975 singles
Harold Melvin & the Blue Notes songs
Dusty Springfield songs
Songs written by Leon Huff
Philadelphia International Records singles
1970 songs
Songs written by Kenny Gamble